Jaime Pedro Gonçalves (26 November 1936 – 6 April 2016) was a Mozambican Roman Catholic archbishop.

Ordained to the priesthood in 1967, Gonçalves was named a bishop of the Roman Catholic Archdiocese of Beira, Mozambique in 1976 and was named archbishop in 1984. He retired in 2012, and died in 2016.

See also

Notes

1936 births
2016 deaths
Mozambican Roman Catholic archbishops
20th-century Roman Catholic archbishops in Africa
21st-century Roman Catholic archbishops in Africa
Roman Catholic archbishops of Beira